The Khegayk or Shegayk were one of the Circassian tribes. They were completely exterminated in the Circassian genocide following the Russo-Circassian War. None were recorded to have survived. In some sources, they are also mentioned under the name "Shegayk".

History 
Khegayks lived in the vicinity of Anapa.

In 1666, Evliya Çelebi, when describing the Anapa fortress, wrote:

"The fortress was built very skillfully and is the creation of a skilled engineer. Inside it are the sheep and goats of the Khegayk tribe. "
At the same time, Evliya Çelebi compiled a detailed description of their life and everyday life:"...These people are known as very strong and brave horsemen. There was a big fight because one of the Tatar warriors took a fish from a Circassian base. The Tatars stole their fish, and they [Circassians] killed them all. From there I went east again, passing dangerous places. All five hundred and fifty houses of the tribe, covered with reeds, fenced, have two doors - one after the other. In all houses there are very capable, skillful people, whose hands are not alien to any craft. If we called them "kafirs" (infidels), they were angry, and if we called them "Muslims", they were happy. However, even if they claim to be Muslims, they deny the resurrection of people on the day of the Judgment... May God forgive us. Their chief, Enjiruk-Bey, eighty years old, bearded, deaf, is a well-fed kafir... This chief owns three thousand horse and foot soldiers."In the 18th century, the number of Khegayk had decreased significantly. Glavani reports about one Khegayk district of 500 dwellings, managed by a chief. The district was located near the coast of the Azov Sea.

In 1724, Xaverio Glavani (French consul in Crimea) at the beginning of 1724, when describing Circassia, wrote:

"The Khegayk district has one chief, to which 500 people are subordinate"

And yet, at this time, a small group of Khegayks still lived near Anapa. It was led by Prince Mehmed Zan, who had several ships and engaged in fishing. Pallas says:"Khegayk are extremely ruined and have diminished in numbers. As a result of plague epidemics and constant hostilities of the Crimean Khanate, the Russo-Circassian War, they were destroyed, and surviving groups of Khegayks left, joining other Adyghe tribes - Chemguy, Natukhaj, Shapsugs."In 1808, Julius Klaproth, in his work - "Travel in the Caucasus and Georgia", reported:

"The small Circassian tribe Khegayk now lives not near Anapa, but on the Bugur and its tributaries. Their Circassian name means: "living near the sea". It had a prince named Mehmet-Girey-Zhana and lived earlier on the site where Anapa was built. Their number decreased significantly as a result of attacks. Their prince was a rich man who traded and had ships on the Black Sea."

In 1820. Frédéric Dubois de Montpere, author of "Travel around the Caucasus", wrote:"the number of the Khegayk tribe is 20,000 people at most"After the Russo-Circassian War, the Khegayk disappeared and were no longer mentioned.

Notables 

 Sefer Bey Zanuqo - military commander, diplomat, nobleman and activist. He took part in the various stages of the Russo-Circassian War in both military and political capacities. He advocated for Circassian independence in the west and acted as an emissary of the Ottoman Empire. By the end of his life Zaneqo had emerged as the leader of the Circassian independence movement.

References 

 Волкова Н. Г. Этнический состав населения Северного Кавказа в XVIII — начале XX века. — М.: Наука, 1974. — С. 20–21.

Circassian tribes
History of Kuban
Historical ethnic groups of Russia
Adygea